Durham Bridge is a rural settlement in York County, New Brunswick, Canada. Locally, there is often a distinction made between Upper and Lower Durham, differentiating the settlement north of the bridge from that south of the bridge.

History
In 1989 a volunteer fire department was started,  since then, the fire department has had numerous expansions.

In late April and early May 2008 major flooding occurred in most of the tributaries of the Saint John River (Bay of Fundy) including the Nashwaak River which runs through Durham Bridge. Numerous houses were damaged, most notably, a moderate sized campground that sits along the river, which was mostly beyond repair. The campground has since been re-opened under new owners and a new name. A number of cottages along the river were also threatened, though most were left undamaged.

Notable people

See also
List of communities in New Brunswick

References

Communities in York County, New Brunswick